Montaut is the name or part of the name of the following communes in France:

 Montaut, Ariège, in the Ariège department
 Montaut, Dordogne, in the Dordogne department
 Montaut, Haute-Garonne, in the Haute-Garonne department
 Montaut, Gers, in the Gers department
 Montaut, Landes, in the Landes department
 Montaut, Lot-et-Garonne, in the Lot-et-Garonne department
 Montaut, Pyrénées-Atlantiques, in the Pyrénées-Atlantiques department
 Montaut-les-Créneaux, in the Gers department
 Cazeneuve-Montaut, in the Haute-Garonne department